The World Rugby Sevens Series hosts have included several different counties. Ten counties currently host a leg of the World Rugby Sevens Series. Several other countries previously hosted tournaments, most recently Scotland and Japan, both of which were terminated following the 2014–15 season.

Current hosts
Hosts are current as of the upcoming 2022–23 series. Interruptions to events are recorded in the footnotes.

Past hosts

Former hosts of current events

Hosts of discontinued events

Tournament hosts
Italics indicates was cancelled

1 The 2001 Brisbane tournament was cancelled by IRB in response to the Australian Government's sporting sanctions against Fiji. 

3 The Dubai tournament was downgraded in status and excluded from the 2001–02 series standings after several teams withdrew in the wake of the September 11 attacks in 2001.

3 The SARS outbreak in Asia prevented the events in Beijing, Singapore and Kuala Lumpur being played, and the Santiago event was withdrawn due to funding issues. 

4 The schedule for the 2012–13 Series was released to the general public in late June 2012. At the time, the schedule included a new event to be held in La Plata, Argentina. However, on 16 August, the Argentine Rugby Union pulled out of hosting an event in 2012–13, citing demands associated with the country's 2012 entry into The Rugby Championship.

References

hosts
International rugby union competitions by host